Epidelaxia is a genus of Asian jumping spiders that was first described by Eugène Louis Simon in 1902. Once considered completely endemic to Sri Lanka, another species was discovered from Philippines in 2016.

Species
 it contains four species, found only in Asia:
Epidelaxia albocruciata Simon, 1902 – Sri Lanka
Epidelaxia albostellata Simon, 1902 (type) – Sri Lanka
Epidelaxia maurerae Freudenschuss & Seiter, 2016 – Philippines
Epidelaxia obscura Simon, 1902 – Sri Lanka

References

Salticidae
Salticidae genera
Spiders of Asia